The Mass No. 13 in B-flat major, Hob. XXII/13, was composed by Joseph Haydn in 1801. It is known as the Schöpfungsmesse or Creation Mass because of the words "Qui tollis peccata mundi" in the Gloria, Haydn recycled music from the Adam and Eve's final duet in The Creation, a fact which scandalized Empress Maria Theresa so much that she ordered Haydn to recompose that passage for her own copy of the work. Additionally, the oft appearing motif in measure 51 of the "Gloria" from Haydn's "Schöpfungsmesse" is identical to the solo Soprano/Tenor motif in measure 13 of "Der Herr ist Groß" from Haydn's "Die Schöpfung."

The work was first performed on 13 September 1801. It consists of six movements:

Notes

References
 Heartz (2009) Daniel. New York. Mozart, Haydn and Early Beethoven: 1781 — 1802 W. W. Norton & Co.
 Holoman (1992) D. Kern. New York Evenings with the Orchestra: a Norton Companion for Concertgoers W. W. Norton & Co.
 Hughes (1974) Rosemary. London. Haydn J. M. Dent & Sons Ltd

External links 
 
 

Masses by Joseph Haydn
Compositions in B-flat major
1801 compositions